The Sisters Liberty is a 1990 Soviet drama film directed by Vladimir Grammatikov.

Plot 
The film tells about twins named Vera and Lyuba, who are invited to pose for pictures in the Art Nouveau style.

Cast 
 Olga Stuchilova as Vera
 Elena Stuchilova as Lyuba
 Aleksandr Orlov as Painter Serzh
 Evgeniy Redko as Italian Painter Guido
 Aleksandr Martynov as Photographer Vadim
 Pyotr Kuleshov as Grandpa
 Aleksandr Vasilyev as Zhenya
 Andrey Zhigalov as Genka
 Vasiliy Funtikov
 Yaroslava Turylyova as Aunt Lida

References

External links 
 

1990 films
1990s Russian-language films
Soviet drama films
1990 drama films